Elsewhere is an album by the American jazz guitarist Joe Morris, recorded in 1996 and released on Homestead. The Joe Morris Ensemble features pianist Matthew Shipp's regular trio with bassist William Parker and drummer Whit Dickey. Morris and Shipp played together once with violinist Mat Maneri in Boston four or five years before.

Reception

In his review for AllMusic, David R. Adler states: "Morris is highly compelling throughout, both in terms of technique and sonic creation." The Penguin Guide to Jazz wrote that "Morris' dogged concentration on melody and his refusal to fall back on harmonic cushions and props is communicated to his three partners, all of whom also have a strong stake in this brand of ragged improvisation."

Track listing
All compositions by Joe Morris
 "Plexus" – 8:03
 "Elsewhere" – 13:58 
 "Cirrus" – 5:13 
 "Violet" – 11:37
 "Mind's Eye" – 6:16 
 "Rotunda" – 15:02

Personnel
Joe Morris - guitar
Matthew Shipp – piano
William Parker – bass
Whit Dickey – drums

References

1996 albums
Joe Morris (guitarist) albums
Homestead Records albums